Vikram S. Buddhi (born May 10th, 1971) is an Indian Ph.D. student and teaching assistant at Purdue University who was imprisoned by United States authorities in 2006 for writing content criticizing George W. Bush, which involved direct death threats via his Yahoo account, and publishing them online. The Department of Immigration quickly detained him after his release from prison since he did not have a valid visa, and he was then expelled to India.

Biography
Buddhi was born to Syamala Buddhi and Captain Buddhi K Subbarao. His father was a senior defense scientist with the Indian navy who had been tried for leaking naval secrets in 1988. However, he was acquitted in 1993. The charges were that he was leaking naval secrets which turned out to be his own Ph.D. thesis which was a document available freely in libraries of reputed institutions of Nuclear Research.

Trial
The prosecution has alleged that Buddhi posted messages on a Yahoo business discussion forum which appeared in December 2005 and January 2006 calling upon the people of Iraq to retaliate against Iraq war and kill then-president George W. Bush, vice-president Dick Cheney and their spouses. Buddhi's lawyer Somnath Bharti has alleged that the indictment did not mention any of the alleged charges and the prosecution failed to establish Buddhi as the author of the messages although they originated from a Purdue University IP address. Buddhi had hacked the Yahoo IDs of thousands of Purdue University Students, then used those hacked stolen IDs to spread anti-Bush, Anti-War messages across Yahoo's Discussion Boards, using an automated software program known as a "Bot".

Reaction
Buddhi has received considerable support from the alumni and staff of the IITs, who have joined with his father and lobbied for his release with External Affairs Minister, SM Krishna and former US President Bill Clinton.

See also
 Freedom of speech in the United States

External links
 Dr. Buddhi Kotasubbarao, "Roxana Saberi And Vikram Buddhi – Compel A Comparison," 21 April 2009, countercurrents.org
  Buddhi v. USA, Motion to Vacate / Correct Illegal Sentence, filed 15 April 2013, Indiana Northern District Court

References

IIT Bombay alumni
Purdue University alumni
1971 births
Living people
People from Delhi